The Central District of Dashti County is in Bushehr province, Iran. At the 2006 census, its population was 41,179 in 9,155 households. The following census in 2011 counted 45,214 people in 11,600 households. At the latest census in 2016, the district had 51,625 inhabitants living in 14,789 households.

References 

Districts of Bushehr Province
Populated places in Dashti County